Cybaeolus is a genus of South American dwarf sheet spiders that was first described by Eugène Simon in 1884.  it contains only three species: C. delfini, C. pusillus, and C. rastellus.

References

Araneomorphae genera
Hahniidae
Spiders of South America
Taxa named by Eugène Simon